Haenkea thoracica is a species of beetle in the family Cerambycidae. It was described by Louis Alexandre Auguste Chevrolat in 1855.

References

Rhopalophorini
Beetles described in 1855